Arthur H. Shore was a mineral prospector and the first person set up a uranium mine in Faraday Township, Ontario. He co-founded and managed the Reeves feldspar Mine and founded the Faraday Uranium Mine. His uranium prospecting, according to Bayne in 1977, led to the "greatest uranium prospecting rush in the world."

Reeves Mine 
From 1945 to 1946, Shore was the Managing Director of Bancroft Feldspar Mines Limited, the company that owned and operated Reeves Mine.

In partnership with Roy Munnings, they mined 1,190 tons of feldspar from the mine, which was located at lot 6, Concession XII of Monteagle Township, just north of Bancroft. Shore employed four workers at the mine.

Faraday Mine 

After unsuccessfully prospecting many locations nearby Bancroft, and after taking advice from Toronto geologist John C. B. Rogers, in 1948 or 1949, Shore discovered uranium at a lot in Faraday Township. The exact location was lot 15, concession A, a mile from Highway 28, 5 miles south of Bancroft.

Shore used adjacent lots 16 and 17 of Concession 10 to developed a mine.

After buying up the property on surrounding lots, on 22 June 1949, Shore incorporated Faraday Uranium Mines Limited, and appointed himself as president.

Shore attempted to raise funds to develop the property, but was initially unsuccessful as potential investors were discouraged the perception that the geology in Bancroft was incompatible with the economical extraction of uranium.

Shore dug trenches and stripped rock himself, employing geologists and engineers when needed, before seriously injuring himself. 

In 1952, Shore received financial support from Toronto-based Newkirk Mining Corporation and work was done by Pole Star Mining.

Shore sold control of the company to Augustus Exploration Limited, who started full development of the site in 1952.

York River Uranium Mines 
Shore, along with fellow prospectors Bob Thompson and Russ McDonell staked prospects on York River Uranium Mines near Bancroft, in October 1955.

Eagles Nest Occurrence 
Shore discovered uranium mineralization at the Eagle Nest Occurrence, 1.3km northeast of Bancroft, in 1956.

Burma Shores Mines Limited 
In 1956, Shore held shares in Burma Shores Mines Limited, a company incorporated in Toronto that had mineral rights in the plots adjacent to Faraday Mine, in Cardiff, Ontario. The company was dissolved in April 1965.

See also 

 Madawaska Mine
 Uranium mining in the Bancroft area

References 

Canadian mining businesspeople
Canadian prospectors
Canadian company founders
Year of birth missing
Year of death missing
People from Hastings County
History of Hastings County